Mangalam River is the main tributary of the river Gayathripuzha, which in turn is a tributary of Bharathapuzha, the second longest river in Kerala, India.  It is around 30 km long in length, with its source from Nelliyampathi forests, and passing through Vadakkencherry, Kannambra, Puthucode, Padur, etc. and joining Gayathripuzha at Plazhi in the border of Thrissur and Palakkad districts.

Cherukunnapuzha is a tributary of Mangalam River and Mangalam Dam is constructed across this river. A canal system for irrigation purpose was completed and opened in 1966, in Alathur taluk, Palakkad district.

Tributaries of the river Mangalam river
 Cherukunnapuzha

See also
Bharathapuzha - Main river
Gayathripuzha - One of the main  tributaries of the river Bharathapuzha

Other tributaries of the river Gayathripuzha
Ayalurpuzha
Vandazhippuzha
Meenkarappuzha
Chulliyar

Rivers of Thrissur district
Rivers of Palakkad district
Bharathappuzha